An accessible image is an image that is made accessible to the visually impaired through touch, magnification, smell or sound.

See also
Tactile graphic

External links
Accessible image discussion list
Tactile graphics resources
Creating accessible images
Seeing with Sound project
Accessible Media Producers

Blindness